Nolan Williams is the name of:

Nolan Williams (baseball), American baseball player
Nolan Williams (composer), American composer
Nolan Williams (politician), American politician